Edenetta is a historic farm property at 6514 Tidewater Trail (United States Route 17) in rural northern Essex County, Virginia, west of the hamlet of Chance.  The main house is a two-story brick building, constructed in the first decade of the 19th century by a member of the locally prominent Waring family.  It was originally Federal in style, but was given Greek Revival features in the 1840s.  The property, which includes a smokehouse and kitchen, remained in the Waring family until 1984.

The property was listed on the National Register of Historic Places in 2016.

See also
National Register of Historic Places listings in Essex County, Virginia

References

Houses on the National Register of Historic Places in Virginia
Farms on the National Register of Historic Places in Virginia
Houses in Essex County, Virginia
National Register of Historic Places in Essex County, Virginia